Berfu Cengiz and Anna Danilina were the defending champions but lost in the first round to Ilona Kremen and Iryna Shymanovich.

Marie Bouzková and Vivian Heisen won the title, defeating Vlada Koval and Kamilla Rakhimova in the final, 7–6(10–8), 6–1.

Seeds

Draw

Draw

References

External Links
Main Draw

President's Cup (tennis) - Doubles
2019 Women's Doubles